The redheaded slut is a cocktail made of Jägermeister, peach-flavored schnapps and cranberry juice.

Preparation and variations
A redheaded slut, also known as a ginger bitch, is typically made as either a mixed drink or a shooter. As a mixed drink the ingredients are generally poured over ice in a small cocktail glass, then stirred. As a shooter, the ingredients are mixed with ice in a cocktail shaker then strained and poured into a shot glass.

A very common variation includes equal parts Jägermeister, Schnapps, Crown Royal and cranberry-flavored vodka.

A relatively uncommon variation substitutes Chambord for the cranberry juice, and sometimes substitutes Canadian whisky and Southern Comfort for the schnapps and Jägermeister.

Another variation, referred to as the Lindsay Lohan, includes a splash of Coke.

On Prince Edward Island, a redheaded slut is a mix of Vodka, Sour Puss, and Raspberry Cordial, a carbonated raspberry soda named for the drink from Anne of Green Gables.

See also
 List of cocktails

References

Cocktails